Gareth Thomas may refer to:

* Gareth Thomas (actor) (1945–2016), Welsh actor
 Gareth Thomas (Welsh politician) (born 1954), former Member of Parliament for the Clwyd West constituency
 Gareth Thomas (English politician) (born 1967), Member of Parliament for Harrow West
 Gareth Thomas (rugby) (born 1974), Welsh rugby union and rugby league footballer
 Gareth Thomas (rugby union, born 1993), Welsh rugby union footballer for the Ospreys

See also
 Gary Thomas (disambiguation)